Reinaldo Rueda Rivera (born 16 April 1957) is a Colombian football coach.

When he was the coach of the Colombia U-20 team, they finished 3rd at the 2003 FIFA World Youth Championship. He also led the Colombia U-17 team to 4th at the 2003 FIFA U-17 World Championship.

After an unfavorable start to the 2006 World Cup qualification phase (only 1 point after 5 games) the Colombian Football Federation made Rueda the coach of the senior team. Under him, the team improved, coming from near last to finish 6th, though failing to qualify. Then, he moved to Honduras and guided their national team to a place at the 2010 FIFA World Cup.

Early life
Born in Cali, Rueda holds a physical education degree. He completed his master's degree at the Deutsche Sporthochschule Köln, Germany, where he also gained proficiency in the German language.  He is also a university professor and has taught several courses at the Colombian National Coaches School. He has continued his studies in Europe, attending FIFA and UEFA coaching courses.

Managerial career

Early career
As a footballer, Rueda played for emerging clubs in amateur and college competitions. However, he decided that coaching would be a better way and later became the coach of Independiente Medellín, Deportivo Cali, and Cortuluá.

Colombia national team
As a coach, Rueda was in charge of the Colombia U-17, U-20, U-21, U-23 and senior teams. Rueda made the final qualifying rounds with the Colombia U-21 in the Toulon Tournament in France in 2000 and 2001. In the first tournament, During Rueda's tenure, Colombia defeated the Republic of Ireland (1–0), Ghana (4–1) and Côte d'Ivoire (3–1). In the final against Portugal on June 3, Colombia won the championship on penalties (3–1).

At the 2003 South American U-20 tournament in Uruguay, Reinaldo Rueda assured his team a ticket to the FIFA U-20 World Cup after a 10-year hiatus. His successes made him the coach of the senior side in 2004 for the task to qualify for the 2006 FIFA World Cup. However, it proved to be a failure and Rueda was sacked after two years in charge.

Honduras national team
Rueda took the helm of the Honduras national football team in January 2007, and led the team to qualification for the 2010 FIFA World Cup, ending 28 years of qualification failures. However, he came under intense scrutiny following criticism of his tactics as the team exited the World Cup at the first stage. On July 28, 2010, Rueda stepped down as Honduras coach after three years at the helm.

Ecuador national team
In August 2010, Rueda took charge as manager of the Ecuador national team. At the 2011 Copa América, the team finished last in a group with Brazil, Venezuela and Paraguay. On 11 October 2013, Ecuador secured a crucial 1–0 win over direct rivals Uruguay in the 17th round of the 2014 FIFA World Cup qualifying. Four days later, even with an Ecuador loss to Chile and a Uruguay win over Argentina in the final round with both teams tying for points and wins, Rueda's side clinched direct qualification with a fourth-place finish due to a better goal difference. At the World Cup, Ecuador exited in the group stage placed third following a 2–1 loss to Switzerland, a 2–1 win over Honduras and a 0–0 draw to France.

Atlético Nacional
On 6 June 2015, Rueda was appointed at Atlético Nacional. In December, the team won the 2015 Torneo Finalización, Rueda's inaugural title in charge of a senior side. Atlético Nacional started off the 2016 season with a 5–0 aggregate win over Deportivo Cali in the Superliga. In the Copa Libertadores, the team had the best campaign in the group stage, with five wins and one draw; in the knockout rounds, they beat Huracán, Rosario Central and São Paulo, before facing Independiente del Valle in the finals and winning the title with an aggregate 2–1 win. They additionally reached the Copa Sudamericana finals that year, finishing as runners-up as the club's board decided to concede the title to Chapecoense. In 2017, Atlético faced Chapecoense in the Recopa Sudamericana and won 6–2 aggregate. Rueda left the club in June, after adding another league title to his tally with the 2017 Apertura.

Flamengo
On 14 August 2017, Rueda joined Brazilian club Flamengo. Under his management, the team reached the finals of the 2017 Copa do Brasil and the 2017 Copa Sudamericana, finishing as runners-up in both competitions. He left at the end of the season, after securing qualification for the 2018 Copa Libertadores group stage with a sixth-place finish in the Série A.

Chile national team
On 8 January 2018, Rueda returned to international management and took charge of the Chile national team. His first match was on 24 March, a 2–1 friendly win over Sweden. At the 2019 Copa América, Chile finished second place in Group C behind Uruguay; in the quarter-finals, they knocked Colombia out in the penalty shootouts after a goalless draw in regulation time. The team finished the tournament in fourth place following a 3–0 loss to Peru in the semifinals and a 2–1 loss to Argentina in the third place play-off. His stint with Chile ended short when Chile only gained four points after the four first matches in the 2022 FIFA World Cup qualification.

Return to the Colombia national team
On 14 January 2021, the Colombian Football Federation announced Rueda's return to the national team. He made his returning debut in the match against Peru for the second time in the 2022 FIFA World Cup qualification, having faced the same opponent in the same qualification as coach of Chile, and made Colombia reach 3rd place in the 2021 Copa América. Again with the qualifications, Colombia managed to defeat Peru 3-0, tied Argentina and Bolivia with a result of 2-2 and 1-1 respectively, to return to the last same scoreline with Paraguay, and a 3-1 win against Chile. However, after the game with Chile, Rueda's team fell into a goal drought, drawing 0-0 with Uruguay, Brazil and Ecuador consecutively, and losing 1-0 again to Brazil. Colombia again drew goalless with Paraguay, and lost the following matches with Peru and Argentina continuing their drought. Colombia finally scored their victories, winning 3-0 against Bolivia and a final victory of 1-0 against Venezuela, however, due to previous results, Colombia finished in sixth place, being eliminated from the World Cup. Rueda left the Colombian team shortly after.

Personal life
In 2011, Rueda was naturalized as a Honduran citizen.

Managerial statistics

Honors
Atlético Nacional
Categoría Primera A (2): 2015 Finalización, 2017 Apertura
Superliga Colombiana (1): 2016
Copa Libertadores (1): 2016
 Copa Colombia (1) : 2016
Recopa Sudamericana (1) : 2017

References

External links
 Reinaldo Rueda at Goal.com (archived)
 

1956 births
Living people
2004 Copa América managers
2010 FIFA World Cup managers
2014 FIFA World Cup managers
2011 Copa América managers
2019 Copa América managers
2021 Copa América managers
Colombian football managers
Chile national football team managers
Colombia national football team managers
Ecuador national football team managers
Honduras national football team managers
Expatriate football managers in Chile
Expatriate football managers in Ecuador
Expatriate football managers in Honduras
University of Valle people
People from Cali
Deportivo Cali managers
Independiente Medellín managers
Atlético Nacional managers
CR Flamengo managers
Categoría Primera A managers
Campeonato Brasileiro Série A managers
Expatriate football managers in Brazil
Colombian expatriate sportspeople in Brazil
Colombia national under-20 football team managers